Car is the most widely spoken Nicobarese language of the Nicobar Islands in the Bay of Bengal.

Although a member of the Austroasiatic language family, it is typologically much more akin to nearby Austronesian languages such as Nias and Acehnese, with which it forms a linguistic area. Car is a VOS language and somewhat agglutinative. There is a quite complicated verbal suffix system with some infixes, as well as distinct genitive and "interrogative" cases for nouns and pronouns.

Phonology

Consonants 

 The alveolar flap can typically be pre-stopped.

Vowels 

 /æ/ only occurs in English loanwords.
 Vowel sounds are also typically short when occurring before an /h/.

Vocabulary
Paul Sidwell (2017) published in ICAAL 2017 conference on Nicobarese languages.

Morphology

Shared morphological alternations: the old AA causative has two allomorphs, prefix ha- with monosyllabic stems, infix -um- in disyllabic stems (note: *p > h onset in unstressed σ).

 ɲa - 'to eat' / haɲaː 'to feed'
 pɯɲ - 'to cry' / hapɯɲ-ɲɔː 'to make cry'
 kucik - 'be palatable' / kumcik 'to taste'
 kale - 'brave' / kumle 'bravery'

References

Languages of India
Agglutinative languages
Nicobarese languages
Verb–object–subject languages